Hawaiian cuisine may refer to:

Cuisine of Hawaii, the broader food culture of the islands including the fusion of native, immigrant, ethnic, local, and restaurant cuisines within the diverse state of Hawaii.
Native Hawaiian cuisine, pre-contact Polynesian cuisine and food eaten by ethnic Hawaiians
Hawaii regional cuisine, a distinct fusion style popularized by professional chefs in Hawaii

See also
List of Hawaiian dishes, popular dishes found in the cuisine of Hawaii